Maynard Shipley (December 1, 1872 – June 18, 1934) was an American freethinker and science writer.

Biography

Shipley was born in Baltimore and was educated at Stanford University, California. He lectured on science and founded the Academy of Science in Seattle, 1898.

He defended evolution and campaigned against creationism and religious fundamentalism. He founded the Science League of America in 1924 of which he was President. The League was known for its advocacy of separation of church and state and protecting the freedom of science education.

Shipley was married to Miriam Allen deFord. He was an active member of the Socialist Party of America but resigned in 1922. He was a member of the Rationalist Press Association and contributed articles to the Truth Seeker. He wrote 33 titles for the Little Blue Books series. He was an atheist.

Shipley was a signer of Humanist Manifesto I. He died in San Rafael, California.

Selected publications

Hypnotism Made Plain (1924)
Principles of Electricity (1924)
The Intelligence of Vertebrate Animals (1924)
Sources of Bible Myths and Legends (1925)
Sex and the Garden of Eden Myth: A Collection of Essays on Christianity (1927)
The War on Modern Science: A Short History of the Fundamentalist Attacks on Evolution and Modernism (1927)
The Real Aims of Catholicism (1928)
The Key to Evolution (1930)

Electoral record

References

Further reading

Miriam Allen deFord. (1956). Up-hill All the Way: The Life of Maynard Shipley. Antioch Press.

External links

Welcome to the Science League of America

1872 births
1934 deaths
American atheists
American humanists
American science writers
American skeptics
American socialists
Critics of Christianity
Critics of creationism
Freethought writers
Stanford University alumni
Writers from Baltimore